Ferris is a city in Dallas and Ellis counties in the U.S. state of Texas. The population was 2,788 in 2020.

History
Settlement of the area began in the early 1870s. Judge Justus Wesley Ferris of Waxahachie handled the transaction, and the community was named for him. Within ten years, Ferris had a population of 300 with a post office, gristmills, cotton gins, four churches, and a school.

On September 18, 1882, an election was held to incorporate the community. A total of 47 votes were cast, 34 (72%) in favor of incorporation and 13 (28%) against. The results were verified by the Ellis County Judge on September 30, and Ferris officially became a town. By 1900, the town was home to 904 residents. In 1910, that number had increased to 1,233 residents.

Fifty businesses, including six brick plants that benefitted from the area's mineral rich soil, were operating in 1914. The population rose to 1,586 by 1925 but declined during the 1930s and 1940s as a result of the Great Depression and World War II.

Ferris thrived during the early post-war years. Four brick plants operated during the 1950s, and the community was known locally as the "Brick Capital of the Nation". Ferris also has a second nickname – "The City that Bricked the World" – which is still commonly used to date. In 1952, the population had risen to 1,734 and 1,807 by 1964. The Ferris Annual Brick Festival is held every year at the end of April.

The expansion of the Dallas–Fort Worth Metropolitan Area and the construction of Interstate 45 aided the growth of Ferris in the latter half of the twentieth century. Although the number of businesses decreased during the 1980s, the population continued to grow. It stood at 2,212 in 1990, 2,175 in 2000, and 2,436 in 2010. In 1994, Ferris won the 3-A State Championship in men's basketball.

Geography
Ferris is located at  (32.535144, −96.667038).

Most of the city lies within Ellis County, with only a small portion in Dallas County.

Climate

According to the Köppen Climate Classification system, Ferris has a humid subtropical climate, abbreviated "Cfa" on climate maps.

Demographics

Per the 2020 United States census, there were 2,788 people, 956 households, and 803 families residing in the city. In 2010, Ferris had a population of 2,436. The racial and ethnic composition of the population in 2010 was 42.7% non-Hispanic white, 17.5% non-Hispanic black, 1% Hispanic black, 0.3% Native American, 0.2% Asian, 1.8% from two or more races and 38.4% Hispanic or Latino. At the 2020 census, its racial and ethnic composition was 32.64% non-Hispanic white, 16.93% Black or African American, 0.07% Native American, 0.43% Asian, 0.04% Pacific Islander, 0.18% some other race, 2.55% multiracial, and 47.17% Hispanic or Latino of any race.

Education 
Pupils in Ferris are served by the Ferris Independent School District.

Some areas in Dallas County not within the Ferris city limits but with Ferris addresses are served by the Dallas Independent School District. The areas were served by the Wilmer-Hutchins Independent School District until it closed during the 2005–2006 school year.

The designated community college for Ellis County is Navarro College. The designated community college for Dallas County is Dallas College (formerly Dallas County Community College District or DCCCD).

Transportation

Major highways
  Interstate 45

Air
The city of Ferris jointly owns the Ferris Red Oak Muni Heliport together with the city of Red Oak. Ferris is also served by the privately owned Dallas South Port Airport.

Notable people

 Guilherme Marchi, Professional bull rider and 2008 PBR world champion
 Homer P. Rainey, Former University of Texas president; briefly attended Ferris High School

References

External links

 City of Ferris official website
 Read the Ferris Wheel newspaper, 1896–1897, hosted by the Portal to Texas History

Dallas–Fort Worth metroplex
Cities in Dallas County, Texas
Cities in Ellis County, Texas
Cities in Texas
Populated places established in 1874
1874 establishments in Texas